GfK (originally ) is European multinational corporation that provides of data and intelligence to the consumer goods industry. It is headquartered in Nuremberg, Germany.

History
GfK was founded as GfK-Nürnberg Gesellschaft für Konsumforschung e. V. in 1934 by university lecturers from Nuremberg, among them the future German Minister of Economic Affairs and Federal Chancellor Ludwig Erhard. The concept was developed by co-founder Wilhelm Vershofen.

Initially, the association conducted 71 different studies, including:

 Awareness of trademarks
 Personal care and soap consumption in Germany
 Structure of beverage consumption in Germany
 Patient and pharmaceuticals
 The motorist assesses the road maps from fuel companies

After the war, GfK’s activities from 1934 to 1945 were investigated by the American occupying powers. Following this investigation, GfK received a license to continue its activities in 1947.

In 1984, commercial activities were spun off into GfK GmbH, which was renamed GfK AG on January 23, 1990. At that time, the “GfK Association” was limited to promoting market and sales research.

In 2010, the company was the world's fourth-largest market research company by revenue.

In December 2016, investment company American private equity group Kohlberg Kravis Roberts made a takeover bid for 18.54 percent of the company's shares.

Since March 2017, GfK SE has been majority-owned (96.7%) by the investment fund Acceleratio Capital N.V., a holding company of KKR.

In the autumn of 2018, GfK’s French competitor Ipsos acquired a division of GfK with 1,000 staff dealing with client-specific projects for 105 million euros.

In 2020, GfK launched gfknewron, a new AI-powered platform. Therefore, customers can access relevant data in real time and receive recommendations for action based on predictions.

Acquisitions 
In April 2005 it acquired NOP World (originally National Opinion Polls), based mostly in the United Kingdom, the United States and Italy, which was rated the world's ninth largest market research business.

In May 2008 it acquired an equity stake in Deep-Packet Inspection company Qosmos in order to track and monitor Internet usage for marketing research.

Organisation 
The management team consists of six individuals (as of 1 February 2021):

 Peter Feld (CEO)
 Sean O’Neill (CPO)
 Lars Nordmark (CFO)
 Jutta Suchanek (CHRDO)
 Joshua Hubbert (COO)
 Benjamin Jones (CTO)

Services 
GfK's core business is collecting and processing data on consumer behavior. It includes advising companies using technology-based applications.

GfK industry area include technology and consumer durables, retail, consumer goods, automotive, financial services, media and entertainment.

It collects data on over 180 million SKUs and surveys over two million people in 15 countries, working in compliance with market and social research associations (such as the ESOMAR Standards) which contain mandatory requirements. It provides real-time insight into market activity. GfK enables its customers to make key business decisions in areas such as marketing and sales.

Since 2020, GfK has offered its customers an AI-powered platform that uses relevant data to provide forecasts and produces recommendations to facilitate critical business decisions.

See also
GfK Entertainment charts

Notes

External links
GfK Group

Companies based in Nuremberg
Market research companies of Germany
Business services companies established in 1934
1934 establishments in Germany
Multinational companies headquartered in Germany
GfK